Heping railway station can refer to:
Heping railway station (Guangdong), PRC
Heping railway station (Taiwan)